KZTK, known as 103.9 The Truck, is a radio station serving the Cass County, North Dakota that airs a country music format. They are licensed to Arthur, North Dakota with studios in Casselton, North Dakota broadcasting to the Fargo–Moorhead Arbitron market (#290).

History
The station originally signed on 96.7 FM in 1992 as KCQV with an oldies format as "Kool 96.7". Kool 96.7 later changed its format. In 2003, the then-KVMI moved from its 5 kilowatt 96.7 signal to a new 25 kilowatt 103.9 frequency at a new transmitter site.

The move to 103.9 also encountered a format change back to oldies as "Kool 103.9". KVMI changed its format to adult contemporary as "Star 103.9" in 2004. The station has since changed to 103.9 "The Truck" and is a hot country format & features The Ben & Jim Show airing 7AM to 9AM Weekdays. The station changed its call sign to the current KZTK on March 13, 2014.

Programming
KVMI changed to a country music brand posing as "103.9 The Truck" in January 2006, along with relocating the studios from Fargo, North Dakota to Casselton, North Dakota. The Truck also broadcasts to rural Cass County and has updates and programming from the Red River Farm Network, where they super serve agriculture communities in rural Cass County. KZTK are the call letters, known as 103.9 The Truck, yet KVMI Radio LLC is the business name and is owned by Vision Media Inc. Vision Media Inc. has as-sole owner since 1999, James A. Babbitt III. The Hot Country Programming is delivered via satellite by Westwood One/Dial Global in Colorado Springs, Colorado.

External links
103.9 The Truck official website

Upper Midwest Broadcasting - Information on the move from 96.7 to 103.9

ZTK
Country radio stations in the United States
Radio stations established in 1992